The 2018 Unibet European Championship was the eleventh edition of the Professional Darts Corporation's European Championship tournament, which saw the top players from the thirteen European tour events compete against each other. The tournament took place from 25–28 October 2018 at the Westfalenhallen in Dortmund, Germany.

Michael van Gerwen was the four-time defending champion, after defeating Rob Cross 11–7 in the 2017 final.  However, he lost against Steve West 7–10 in the second round, ending a 21-game unbeaten run.

It means that Phil Taylor still holds the record of the longest unbeaten run in this tournament (22 matches). For the first in the history of this tournament, no Dutch player reached the quarter-finals.

James Wade became European Champion for the first time and won his first ranking major since 2011 after beating Simon Whitlock 11–8 in the final.

Prize money
The 2018 European Championship will have a total prize fund of £400,000, equal the amount of the last staging of the tournament. The following is the breakdown of the fund:

Qualification
The 2018 tournament continues the new system in terms of qualification with the two previous editions: The top 32 players from the European Tour Order of Merit, which is solely based on prize money won in the thirteen European tour events during the season, qualifying for the tournament.

In a change from previous years, the draw was done in a fixed bracket by their seeded order with the top qualifier playing the 32nd, the second playing the 31st and so on.

The following players will take part in the tournament:

Draw

References

2018
2018 European Championship (darts)
2018 in darts
2018 in German sport
October 2018 sports events in Germany